Santo Stefano is the Italian name of Saint Stephen.

Santo Stefano may also refer to:

Places

Islands
Santo Stefano (island), an island in Sardinia, Italy
Santo Stefano Island, an island in the Pontine Islands, Italy

Cities, towns and villages in Italy
Oggiona con Santo Stefano, a comune in the Province of Varese, Lombardy
Pieve Santo Stefano, a comune in the Province of Arezzo, Tuscany
Porto Santo Stefano, a frazione and municipal seat of Monte Argentario (GR), Tuscany
Rocca Santo Stefano, a comune (municipality) in the Province of Rome, Lazio
Santo Stefano al Mare, a commune in the Province of Imperia, Liguria
Santo Stefano Belbo, a comune in the Province of Cuneo, Piedmont
Santo Stefano d'Aveto, a comune in the province of Genoa, Liguria
Santo Stefano del Sole, a comune in the province of Avellino, Campania
Santo Stefano di Cadore, a comune in the province of Belluno, Veneto
Santo Stefano di Camastra, a comune in the Province of Messina, Sicily
Santo Stefano di Magra, a comune in the Province of La Spezia, Liguria
Santo Stefano di Rogliano, a comune in the province of Cosenza, Calabria
Santo Stefano di Sante Marie, a locality in the comune of Sante Marie in the Province of L'Aquila, Abruzzo
Santo Stefano di Sessanio, a comune in the Province of L'Aquila, Abruzzo
Santo Stefano in Aspromonte, a comune in the Province of Reggio Calabria, Calabria
Santo Stefano in Vairano, a  frazione of the comune of Crema, in the province of Cremona, Lombardy
Santo Stefano Lodigiano, in the Province of Lodi, Lombardy
Santo Stefano Quisquina a comune in the Province of Agrigento, Sicily 
Santo Stefano Roero, a comune in the Province of Cuneo, Piedmont
Santo Stefano Ticino, a comune in the Province of Milan, Lombardy
Villa Santo Stefano, a comune in the Province of Frosinone, Lazio

Churches and other religious buildings
Santo Stefano, Assisi, a medieval church in Assisi, in central Italy
Santo Stefano, Bologna, a complex of religious edifices in the city of Bologna, Italy
Santo Stefano (Capri), a church and former cathedral in Capri, Italy
Santo Stefano (Genoa), a church in Genoa, northern Italy
Santo Stefano al Ponte, a church in Florence
Santo Stefano degli Abissini, a parish church of the Catholic Church in Vatican City
Santo Stefano degli Ungheresi, the former church of the Hungarians in Rome, next to the Vatican, demolished in 1776
Santo Stefano del Cacco (also Santo Stefano de Pinea), a church in Rome
Santo Stefano di Venezia, a church in Venice
Santo Stefano Maggiore, a basilica in Milan
Santo Stefano in Manciano, a medieval abbey, long abandoned, at Manciano (frazione of Trevi)) in Umbria, Italy 
Santo Stefano Rotondo (also Santo Stefano al Monte Celio), an ancient basilica in Rome

Other uses
 Santo Stefano Lizard, a reptile which became extinct in 1965
 Ordine di Santo Stefano Papa e Martire, the dynastic-military Order of Saint Stephen

See also 
San Stefano (disambiguation)